Comrades is a 1919 German silent film directed by Johannes Guter. It is based on the play Marauders by August Strindberg.

Plot
Axel and Bertha are a modern, emancipated artist couple in Paris. He is feminine and vain. She is financially independent, a member of the women's association "Married's Women's right of ownership" and uses male nude models.

Cast

References

Bibliography

External links

1919 films
Films of the Weimar Republic
German films based on plays
Films based on works by August Strindberg
Films directed by Johannes Guter
German silent feature films
German black-and-white films
UFA GmbH films
1910s German films